"Islamofascism", first described as "Islamic fascism" in 1933, is a term popularized in the 1990s drawing an analogical comparison between the ideological characteristics of specific Islamist or Islamic fundamentalist movements and short-lived European fascist movements of the early 20th century, neo-fascist movements, or totalitarianism.

History and concept

Background and origins
The term "Islamofascism" is defined in the New Oxford American Dictionary as "a term equating some modern Islamic movements with the European fascist movements of the early twentieth century".

The earliest known use of the contiguous term Islamic Fascism dates to 1933 when Akhtar Ḥusayn Rā’ēpūrī, in an attack on Muḥammad Iqbāl, defined attempts to secure the independence of Pakistan as a form of Islamic fascism. Some analysts consider Manfred Halpern's use of the phrase 'neo-Islamic totalitarianism' in his 1963 book The Politics of Social Change in the Middle East and North Africa, as a precursor to the concept of Islamofascism, in that he discusses Islamism as a new kind of fascism. Halpern's primary case was based on an analysis of the Muslim Brotherhood in Egypt, and he argued that such Islamic movements were an obstacle to the military regimes who were in his view representatives of a new middle class capable of modernizing the Middle East. Halpern's work, commissioned by the United States Air Force from the Rand Corporation,  arguably represents a mix of mid-Cold War analysis and orientalism.

In 1978, Maxime Rodinson, a distinguished Marxist scholar of Islam, responded to French avant-garde enthusiasm for Khomeini's revolution in a three part article in Le Monde, by arguing that, in response to successive assaults by Crusaders, Mongols, Turks and Western imperialism,  Islamic countries had come to feel embattled, and the impoverished masses had come to think of their elites, linked to foreigners, as devoid of traditional piety. Both nationalism and socialism imported from the West were recast in religious terms, in a process of political Islamicization which would be devoid of the progressive side of nationalism and revert to what he called "a type of archaic fascism" characterized by policing the state to enforce a totalitarian moral and social order.

The earliest example of the term "Islamofascism," according to William Safire, occurs in an article penned by the Scottish scholar and writer Malise Ruthven writing in 1990. Ruthven used it to refer to the way in which traditional Arab dictatorships used religious appeals in order to stay in power. Malise Ruthven, Construing Islam as a Language, The Independent 8 September 1990. "Nevertheless there is what might be called a political problem affecting the Muslim world. In contrast to the heirs of some other non-Western traditions, including Hinduism, Shintoism and Buddhism, Islamic societies seem to have found it particularly hard to institutionalise divergences politically: authoritarian government, not to say Islamo-fascism, is the rule rather than the exception from Morocco to Pakistan." Ruthven doubts that he himself coined the term, stating that the attribution to him is probably due to the fact that internet search engines don't go back beyond 1990.

Young Egyptian Party 
The Young Egypt Party was a political party that operated between 1933 and 1953 within Egypt, following an Egyptian nationalist, pro-Islamic and corporatist agenda inspired by Italian fascism and Fascist Italy under Benito Mussolini.

Popularisation after 2001
As a neologism it was adopted broadly in the wake of the September 11 attacks to intimate that either all Muslims, or those Muslims who spoke of their social or political goals in terms of Islam, were fascists. Khalid Duran is often credited with devising the phrase at that date. He used it in 2001 to characterize Islamism generally, as a doctrine that would compel both a state and its citizens to adopt the religion of Islam. Neo-conservative journalist Lulu Schwartz is regarded as the first Westerner to adopt the term and popularise it in the aftermath of the attack on the World Trade Center. In an article in The Spectator, Schwartz used it to describe the  ideology of Osama Bin Laden. She defines it as the "use of the faith of Islam as a cover for totalitarian ideology" and alleges that various Islamist movements shares fundamental ideological features of fascism. The term was sufficiently in vogue by 2002 to lead the cultural historian Richard Webster to remonstrate with its usage, in arguing that grouping many different political ideologies, terrorist and insurgent groups, governments, and religious sects into one single idea of "Islamofascism" both grossly oversimplifies, and induces us to ignore root causes, a key one of which, in his view, was 'the history of Western colonialism in the Middle East, and above all in Palestine'.

Accounts differ as to who popularized the term. President George Bush introduced the term officially during his presidency. According to Safire, author Christopher Hitchens was responsible for its diffusion, while Valerie Scatamburlo d'Annibale argues that its popularization is due to the work of Eliot Cohen, former counselor to Condoleezza Rice, reputed occasionally to be "the most influential neocon in academe". It circulated in neoconservative circles for some years after 2001 and came into wider currency after President George W. Bush, still grappling to find a phrase that might identify the nature of the "evil" which would define the nature of his enemy in the War on Terror, stated in 2005 that Islamofascism was an ideology synonymous with Islamic radicalism and militant jihadism, which, he then clarified, was decidedly distinct from the religion of Islam. It moved into the mainstream in August 2006.  After the arrest of Islamic terrorists suspected of preparing to blow up airlines, Bush once more alluded to "Islamic Fascists", apparently a "toned-down" variant of the word, The public use of the neologism and the analogous Islamic fascism during the run-up to the U.S. 2006 mid-term elections, perhaps with a specific focus group in mind, provoked an outcry, or storm of protest, and was quickly dropped from the president's rhetorical armory. Katha Pollitt, stating the principle that, "if you control the language, you control the debate", remarked that while the term looked "analytic", it was emotional and "intended to get us to think less and fear". David Gergen, former speechwriter for Richard Nixon, commented that the phrase "confuses more than it clarifies", for "Islamic fascism has no meaning" in the Arab world. Neoconservative writers, critics and scholars from Hitchens to Robert Wistrich however responded that the Muslim religion itself is fascistic, a view which, in identifying Islam with political fascism, was lambasted for being as offensive as the term Judeo-Nazi coined in the 1970s by Yeshayahu Leibowitz, editor of the Encyclopedia Hebraica, to characterize Messianic Jews settling in the occupied West Bank. Hitchens replied that the link is no more deleterious than that made by Leibowitz, or by left-wing analysts who wrote of clerical fascism.

Islamo-Fascism Awareness Week 

David Horowitz developed an "Islamo-Fascist Awareness Week" consisting of 26 workshops on university campuses, between 2226 October 2007. Critics call it a (conservative) buzzword. The term has also been seen to have been popularized by the counter-jihad movement.  A number of Republicans, such as Rick Santorum, used it as shorthand for terrorists, and Donald Rumsfeld dismissed critics of the invasion of Iraq as appeasers of a "new type of fascism". In April 2008, the Associated Press reported that US federal agencies, including the State Department and the Department of Homeland Security, were advised to stop using the term Islamo-fascism in a fourteen-point memo issued by the Extremist Messaging Branch, a department of another federal body known as the National Counterterrorism Center. Aimed at improving the presentation of the War on Terrorism before Muslim audiences and the media, the memo states: "We are communicating with, not confronting, our audiences. Don't insult or confuse them with pejorative terms such as 'Islamo-fascism,' which are considered offensive by many Muslims." By 2007 Norman Podhoretz, arguing that the United States was in the midst of World War IV, identified Iran as the main center of the Islamofascist ideology he was convinced America had been fighting since 2001. Podhoretz called on the United States to bomb Iran as "soon as logistically possible".

Journalistic analysis
Schwartz's approach argues that several factors buttressed his notion of a similarity between fascism and Islamic fundamentalist terror: 
Resentment by an economically frustrated middle class as feeding the rage that led to fascism, something that fitted Al-Qaeda's hold on sections of the Saudi, Pakistani, and Egyptian middle classes, and also on Hezbollah's attraction for Shia in Lebanon; 
Most forms of Fascism to date have been imperialistic, as are, he claimed, Wahhabis and Hezbollah; 
It was totalitarian insofar as Islamic fundamentalist may impose takfir, putting all members of global Islam who dissent with their extremism outside the Ummah;
Both have  paramilitary organizations, and not just a politically organized ideological grouping. While none of these are intrinsic to Islam, he stated, they are all part of Islamofascism, and the distortion mirrors that brand of Christian extremism which led to clerical fascism.

Although he prefers to speak of "fascism with an Islamic face", a variation on the phrase "Islam with a fascist face" deployed by Fred Halliday to describe developments in Iran after the overthrow of the Shah in 1979, Hitchens insisted that Bin Ladenism and Salafism shared similarities with clerical fascism, a term already used by Walter Laqueur to refer to the recent form a resurgent Islamic fundamentalism was taking. Such clerical fascism was, he argued, like Islamic fundamentalism, had a devotion to a charismatic leader, a point contested by Frederick W. Kagan, trusted in the authoritative power of one book, was queasy about sexual deviance, contemptuous of women, hostile to modernity. nostalgic for past glories, toxicly Judeophobic, obsessed with old grievances, real and imagined, and addicted to revenge. Islamofascism was, he allowed, not perfectly congruent, with European fascism, in that the latter idealized the nation-state. Islam has no concept of a master race. On the other hand, he affirmed, the notion of a revived Caliphate might lend itself to an analogy with Hitler's Greater Germany, and Mussolini's desire to revive the Roman Empire, as Islamic rhetoric about the pure believers as opposed to the kuffār suggests a non-ethnic based form of cleansing.

The American journalist and former Nixon speechwriter William Safire wrote that the term fulfilled a need for a term to distinguish traditional Islam from terrorists: "Islamofascism may have legs: the compound defines those terrorists who profess a religious mission while embracing totalitarian methods and helps separate them from devout Muslims who want no part of terrorist means." Eric Margolis denied any resemblance between anything in the Muslim world, with its local loyalties and consensus decision-making and the historic, corporative-industrial states of the West. "The Muslim World", he argued, "is replete with brutal dictatorships, feudal monarchies, and corrupt military-run states, but none of these regimes, however deplorable, fits the standard definition of fascism. Most, in fact, are America's allies."

Malise Ruthven opposed redefining Islamism as "Islamofascism," a term whose usage has been "much abused". The Islamic label can be used for legitimizing and labeling a movement, but ideology must be distinguished from the brand name associated with it. The difference between Islamic movements and fascism are more "compelling" than the analogies. Islam defies doctrinal unification. No particular order of government can be deduced from Islamic texts, any more than from Christianity. Spanish fascists drew support from traditional Catholic doctrines, but by the same token, other Catholic thinkers have defended democracy in terms of the same theological traditions.

Scholarly analysis
The widespread use in mass media of the term "Islamofascism" has been challenged as confusing because of its conceptual fuzziness. George Orwell, it has been noted in this connection, observed as early as 1946 that "[T]he word Fascism has now no meaning except in so far as it signifies 'something not desirable'", and linking Islam to that concept was more a matter of denigration than of ideological clarity. Chibli Mallat, while noting that the term is controversial, thinks it warranted but notes that there is something anomalous about Islam being singled out, since fascist practices among Jews in Israel, Buddhists in Burma, and Narendra Modi's Hindi constituencies in India do not generate the same terminology: one rarely hears of Hindu-, Buddhist- or Judeo-fascism. A number of scholars and thinkers, such as Michel Onfray, Michael Howard, Jeffrey Herf, Walter Laqueur, and Robert Wistrich have argued that the link between fascism and Islam/Islamic radicalism is sound. Many scholars who specialize in Islam and the Arabic world are skeptical of the thesis: Reza Aslan, for one, identifies the roots of jihadism not in the Qur'an, but in the writings of modern Arab anti-colonialists and, doctrinally, to Ahmad Ibn Taymiyyah  Historians like Niall Ferguson dismiss the word as an "extraordinary neologism" positing a conceptual analogy when there is "virtually no overlap between the ideology of al Qaeda and fascism".

Walter Laqueur, after reviewing this and related terms, concluded that "Islamic fascism, Islamophobia and antisemitism, each in its way, are imprecise terms we could well do without but it is doubtful whether they can be removed from our political lexicon."

Support

Manfred Halpern,  the first major thinker to characterize politicized Islam as a fascist movement, called it "Neo-Islamic Totalitarianism" in his classic 1963 study The Politics of Social Change in the Middle East and North Africa.

The French Marxist Maxime Rodinson described Islamic movements such as the Muslim Brotherhood as a "type of archaic fascism" whose goal was the establishment of a "totalitarian state whose political police would brutally enforce the moral and social order."  He accused the French left of celebrating in Islamism a religious form of fascism.

The sociologist Saïd Amir Arjomand has argued since 1984 that Islamism and fascism share essential features, an argument he made at some length in his 1989 book The Turban for the Crown; The Islamic revolution in Iran.

American scholar Michael Howard has defended usage of the term, drawing parallels between Wahhabism and fascist ideologies in Europe. Howard has stated that he initially "deeply opposed" to Bush's idea of a global "war on terror": it was not a war in his view, except metaphorically, and according to Howard, it is possible to wage war against an abstract concept such as terror. He further noted that giving one's adversary a belligerent status by reciprocating their idea that they are engaged in a war, as opposed to a confrontation where the question was one of "criminal disruption of civil order", would only increase their support among the civilian population. Despite this, Howard endorsed Bush's description of the adversary as "Islamic fascists", though he qualified this by stating that "although they are no more typical of their religion than the fanatics who have committed abominations in the name of Christianity", and their teachings are as much derived from Western notions as from Islamic schools of thought. Fascism is, for Howard, "the rejection of the entire legacy of the Enlightenment" with its values of "reason, toleration, open-ended inquiry and the rule of law".

Criticism
The term "Islamofascism" has been criticized by several scholars. While Islamic Fascism has been discussed as a category of serious analysis by the scholars mentioned above, the term "Islamofascism" circulated mainly as a propaganda, rather than as an analytic, term after the September 11 attacks on the United States in September 2001 but also gained a foothold in more sober political discourse, both academic and pseudo-academic. Many critics are dismissive, variously branding it as "meaningless" (Daniel Benjamin); "a kosher-halal" throwback version of the "vacuous" old leftist epithet "fascist pig" (Norman Finkelstein); a "figment of the neocon imagination" (Paul Krugman); and as betraying an ignorance of both Islam and Fascism (Angelo Codevilla).

Tony Judt, in an analysis of liberal acquiescence in President George W. Bush's foreign policy initiatives, particularly the War on Terror and the invasion of Iraq, argued that this policy was premised on the notion there was such a thing as Islamofascism, a notion Judt considered catastrophic. In his diagnosis of this shift he detected a decline in the old liberal consensus of American politics, and what he called the "deliquescence of the Democratic Party". Many former left-liberal pundits, like Paul Berman and Peter Beinart having no knowledge of the Middle East or cultures like those of Wahhabism and Sufism on which they descant authoritatively, have, he claimed, and his view was shared by Niall Ferguson, latched onto the war on terror as a new version of the old liberal fight against fascism, in the form of Islamofascism. In their approach there is a cozy acceptance of a binary division of the world into ideological antitheses, the "familiar juxtaposition that eliminates exotic complexity and confusion: Democracy v. Totalitarianism, Freedom v. Fascism, Them v. Us" has been revived. Judt cited many others who, once liberals have fallen in lockstep with the American idea of a global war against Islamic jihad: Adam Michnik, Oriana Fallaci; Václav Havel; André Glucksmann, Michael Ignatieff, Leon Wieseltier, David Remnick, Thomas Friedman and Michael Walzer. Christopher Hitchens was also criticized by Judt, as making unhistoric simplifications, to justify use of the term.

In 2012 a special issue of Die Welt des Islams was dedicated to surveying the issue of Islamophobia in recent Western reportage and scholarly studies, with essays on various facets of the controversy by Katajun Amirpur, Moshe Zuckerman, René Wildangel, Joachim Scholtyseck and others. Their positions were almost invariably critical of the term and the concept underlying it.

In a 2016 lecture, American historian Paul Gottfried proposed that some strains of Islam could accurately be described as Islamist or Islamic terrorist but definitely not fascist, because he  maintains that the only accurate use of Fascism is to describe the government of Italy under Mussolini from 1922 to 1938.

See also

 Amin al-Husseini
 Anti-Masonry
 Clerical fascism
 Islamic extremism
 Islamic fundamentalism
 Islamism
 Islamophobia
 Islamic religious police
 Islamic State of Iraq and the Levant
 Jihad
 Muhammad Najati Sidqi
 Muslim Patrol incident
 Nazi SS Division Handschar (Bosnian Muslims)
 Nazi SS Division Skanderbeg (Muslim Albanians)
 Nazi SS Division Kama (Bosnian Muslims)
 Relations between Nazi Germany and the Arab world
 Sharia
 Talibanization
 Takfiri
 Worldwide caliphate
 Wahhabi movement
 Deobandi movement

Citations

References
 
 
 
 
 
 
 
 
 
 
 
 
 
 
 
 
 
 
 
 
 
 
 
 
 
 
Landgrebe, Phillip: Arabische Muslim_innen und der Nationalsozialismus und die Bestände des International Tracing Service (ITS). In: Lernen aus der Geschichte, 31 July 2017 [in German].

Further reading

 Abdel-Samad, Hamed. Islamic Fascism, Prometheus Books, 2016.

 Tibi, Bassam.  From Sayyid Qutb to Hamas, The Middle-East Conflict and the Islamization of Antisemtism, in Yale Initiative for the Interdisciplinary Study of Antisemitism, online working paper, 2010
 Ignatius, David. "Toward a Definition of 'Islamic Fascism'", Daily Star (Lebanon), August 19, 2006

External links

Islam-related controversies
Islamism
Political neologisms
Far-right politics
Political slurs
Islamophobia
Fascists by religion
Islamic extremism
Counter-jihad